Belisa may refer to:

Literary characters
Belisa in the play El acero de Madrid by Félix Lope de Vega 1608
:es:Los melindres de Belisa, Félix Lope de Vega 1608
:es:Las bizarrías de Belisa, Félix Lope de Vega 1634
The Love of Don Perlimplín and Belisa in the Garden, play by Lorca
Belisa, opera by Miguel Ángel Coria 1922, one of at least six operas based on Lorca's play
Belisa (Olsen), 1966 Danish opera by Poul Rovsing Olsen

People
Belisa Vranich (1966) American author and founder of The Breathing Class (TM)